The Norwegian Export Council was a Norwegian state-owned consultant organ established in 1945. Its role was to provide consultancy and advice for the Ministry of Foreign Affairs in export-related matters. Until 1994 the council was financed by a levy on exports, but from 1996 it was a foundation co-financed by the Ministry of Foreign Affairs and the Confederation of Norwegian Enterprise. It was superseded by Innovation Norway on 1 January 2004.

Directors
1946–1948 Bjarne Børde
1948–1951 Thor Brodtkorb
1951–1952 Bjarne Børde
1953–1955 Nils Anton Jørgensen
1955–1971 Otto Christian Malterud
1971–1979 Gunnar Rogstad
1979–1982 Einar Magnussen
1983–1988 Arne Langeland
1988–1995 Kjell-Martin Fredriksen
1995–2001 Per Andreas Vogt
2002–2003 Arild H. Blixrud

References

Defunct government agencies of Norway
Foundations based in Norway
1945 establishments in Norway
Organizations established in 1945
2004 establishments in Norway
Organizations established in 2004